John Francis "Jack" Trout (January 31, 1935 – June 4, 2017) was an American advertising executive and an owner of Trout & Partners, a consulting firm. He was one of the founders and pioneers of positioning theory and also marketing warfare theory.

Career
Trout started his business career in the advertising department of General Electric. From there he went on to become a divisional advertising manager at Uniroyal. He then joined Al Ries in the advertising agency and marketing strategy firm where they worked together for over twenty-six years.

He was the founder and president of the international marketing strategy firm "Trout and Partners". The firm is represented in offices in many countries worldwide including emerging markets. Trout worked with a number of different client companies, including AT&T, Apple, Citicorp, General Electric, Hewlett-Packard, IBM, Pfizer, Procter & Gamble, Southwest Airlines, and Xerox. When working with pizza chain Papa John's, Trout was majorly involved in the invention of the chain's slogan "better ingredients, better pizza."

In the fall of 2002, Trout began working with the United States Department of State in order to "train new diplomats in the art of projecting a positive image of America overseas" as a part of the Brand America campaign, which sought to improve public opinion about the upcoming Iraq War.

Trout died of intestinal cancer at his home in Old Greenwich, Connecticut, at the age of 82.

Family
He was survived by his wife Patricia, their six children and 15 grandchildren, and four siblings.

Books

With Steve Rivkin

With Al Ries

References

1935 births
2017 deaths
Writers from Manhattan
Iona University alumni
Marketing theorists
Marketing people
American marketing people
Advertising theorists
Branding theorists
American business theorists
Deaths from cancer in Connecticut
Deaths from colorectal cancer
20th-century American male writers
21st-century American male writers
20th-century American writers